Mount Liamuiga is a  stratovolcano which forms the western part of the island of Saint Kitts. The peak is the highest point on the island of Saint Kitts, in the federation of Saint Kitts and Nevis, and in the entire British Leeward Islands, as well as one of the tallest peaks in the eastern Caribbean archipelago. As of 2006, the crater lake had re-formed. The last verified eruptions from the volcano were about 1,800 years ago, while reports of possible eruptions in 1692 and 1843 are considered uncertain.

Mount Liamuiga was formerly named Mount Misery. The renaming took place on the date of St. Kitts' independence, September 19, 1983. However, many older citizens still refer to it as Mount Misery. The name Liamuiga is derived from the Kalinago name for the entire island of St. Kitts, which means, "fertile land."

Many tours and guided hikes are organized to the peak's summit and surrounding rainforests, usually starting from Belmont Estate in the village of St. Paul's. From the summit, the views are outstanding, including the entire island and the beautiful Caribbean Sea, as well as the neighbouring islands of Saba, Sint Eustatius, Saint Barthélemy, Saint Martin, Antigua, and Nevis.

See also 
 List of volcanoes in Saint Kitts and Nevis

References 

Sources
 University of the West Indies - Seismic Research Unit: St. Kitts Volcanism (extensive info, photos, and geological maps)

External links 
 

Mountains of Saint Kitts and Nevis
Saint Kitts (island)
Volcanoes of Saint Kitts and Nevis
Highest points of countries
Volcanic crater lakes
Subduction volcanoes
Holocene stratovolcanoes
Holocene North America
Potentially active volcanoes